Seth Anandram Jaipuria School, Lucknow (often called Jaipuria School, Lucknow) is a co-educational day and boarding private school from the Nursery to XII grades, located in the Sushant, Golf City, Lucknow.  The school is affiliated to the Central Board of Secondary Education (CBSE), Delhi.  - The Principal of the School is Poonam Kochitty.  Seth Anandram Jaipuria School, Lucknow was inaugurated by Honorable Shri Akhilesh Yadav, Chief Minister, Uttar Pradesh, on 17 April 2016.

Administration
The senior team as of 2022.

Special Features
The school also has some features that are usually not available in other schools in Lucknow :

 Microsoft Showcase School
 Interactive Smart Classes with use of Educomputer
 Safe & Secure Premises with round the clock guards and security provisions
 Table Tennis
 Indoor Sporting Arenas with Swimming Pool Archery
 Badminton, Table Tennis and Cricket
Playgrounds and Activity Rooms
 Well-equipped Science and Computer Laboratories
 Art & Craft room
 Indian Classical, Indian Modern and Western Music rooms
 State of the art teaching facilities. Each class room is equipped with Smart Interactive Board & TATA Edge’s Digital Resource Materials
 Basic utilities such as round the clock clean water and electricity and lube
 Open Assembly area
 Well maintained sanitation facilities
 Splash Pool
 Multipurpose Hall

Curriculum 
The school offers national syllabus developed by the NCERT, New Delhi in the light of the new education policy.  The school prepares students for:

 All India Secondary Examination (at the end of class X)
 All India Senior Secondary Certificate Examination (at the end of class XII)

House system 
The houses are Ganga, Narmada, Godavari & Krishna. Each house is supervised by a House incharge assisted by a team of teachers and office bearers of students’ council in managing the day to day commitment.

Organisation 
Mr. Shishir Jaipuria is the Chairman of Jaipuria Group of Educational Institutions comprising including 17 K-12 schools, 4 pre-schools and 2 business management institutions.  As an industrialist, he is CMD, Ginni Filaments Ltd,<ref></ref> an integrated traditional textile company that holds a large share of the technical textile market in India.

Location 
Seth Anandram Jaipuria School, Lucknow
Pocket-3, Sector-D, Amar Shaheed Path, Golf City, Lucknow, Uttar Pradesh

Notable alumni
 Vijay Krishna Acharya - Film Director
 Sanjay Gupta - MD, Dainik Jagran

References

External links 
 Official website
 Seth Anandram Jaipuria School Kanpur
 Seth Anandram Jaipuria School, Ghaziabad

Schools in Lucknow
2016 establishments in Uttar Pradesh
Educational institutions established in 2016